PD-217,014 is a drug developed by Pfizer and related to gabapentin, which similarly binds to the α2δ calcium channels (1 and 2). It was developed as a potentially more potent successor to gabapentin and pregabalin, along with several other analogues such as atagabalin and 4-methylpregabalin, but while PD-217,014 produces visceral analgesic effects in animal studies with higher potency and efficacy than gabapentin, it was not developed further for clinical use because of its comparatively more complex synthesis, compared to other related analogues.

References

Abandoned drugs
Amino acids
Analgesics
Calcium channel blockers
GABA analogues
Pfizer brands